Retak Hill, is one of the major hills shared between Mukim Amo, Temburong District of Brunei and Limbang Division, Sarawak of Malaysia.

Description 
Montane forest covers the hill, followed by the presence of quartzite rocks and metamorphosed siltstones.

History 
A crucial expedition team was sent to the forests around Tembikai and Retak Hill in 1978. In the early 1980s, it was known that Netelia harmani wasps were found on the hill. Moreover, Papilio acheron butterflies were also found on the mountain.

References

Temburong District
Mountains of Brunei
Bukit Pagon
International mountains of Asia
Brunei–Malaysia border